Fazenda is a settlement in the northern part of the island of Santiago, Cape Verde. It is situated 4 km north of Tarrafal.

History 
Most houses in the region were built at the end of the 20th century. Most of them have been made of adobe, as well as brick and stone until the middle of the 20th century. A small part has been made of steel and cement. The lifestyle is low, as well as the incomes of the local people who are engaged in growing were more worrisome until the middle of the 20th century. The majority of the population are farmers, growing bananas, pineapples, other fruit and vegetable crops, as well as engaging in cattle care. Electricity, as well as communications and other services such as telephone lines, were introduced and put into service since the middle of the 20th century, serving the majority of the population.

Geography 
The settlement of Fazenda is located in the municipality of Santa Cruz on the eastern side of the island of Santiago, Cape Verde, approximately 25 kilometers northeast of the capital, Praia. The village is located on the edge of a plateau leaning over a fertile valley. The river valley (Ribeirao) located to the north of the settlement periodically floods during the rainy season, but it remains dry for 10 months a year. The groundwater is near the surface and the farmers access it through numerous wells with which they irrigate their crops. A fertile soil and easy access to water, make this valley an eminently agricultural area. Towards the southeast of the town there is an ancient lava field that ends in the sea, this area is practically sterile, but local farmers grow with success an acacia forest.

References

External links 

 http://cv.geoview.info/achada_fazenda_santiago_cabo_verde,68477132p

Villages and settlements in Santiago, Cape Verde
Tarrafal Municipality